DZTP (693 AM) Radyo Tirad Pass is a radio station owned and operated by Tirad Pass Radio-Television Broadcasting Network. The station's studio and transmitter are located in Brgy. San Nicolas, Candon.

References

News and talk radio stations in the Philippines
Radio stations in Ilocos Sur
Radio stations established in 1995